Peter David Mosses (born 1948) is a British computer scientist.

Peter Mosses studied mathematics as an undergraduate at Trinity College, Oxford, and went on to undertake a DPhil supervised by Christopher Strachey in the Programming Research Group while at Wolfson College, Oxford in the early 1970s. He was the last student to submit his thesis under Strachey before Strachey's death.

In 1978, Mosses published his compiler-compiler, the Semantic Implementation System (SIS), which uses a denotational semantics description of the input language.

Mosses has spent most of his career at BRICS in Denmark. He returned to a chair at Swansea University, Wales. His main contribution has been in the area of formal program semantics. In particular, with David Watt he developed action semantics, a combination of denotational, operational and algebraic semantics.

Currently, Mosses is a visitor at TU Delft, working with the Programming Languages Group.

References

External links 
 Home page
 

Living people
Alumni of Trinity College, Oxford
Alumni of Wolfson College, Oxford
Members of the Department of Computer Science, University of Oxford
British computer scientists
Academics of Swansea University
Formal methods people
1948 births